The 2019–20 Pro A season, for sponsorships reasons the Jeep Élite, was the 98th season of the Pro A, the top basketball league in France organised by the Ligue Nationale de Basket (LNB). It was the third season with Jeep as main sponsor. The season started on 21 September 2019.  On 31 March 2020, the league was suspended until further notice due to the COVID-19 pandemic. On 27 May 2020, the league was declared void and cancelled. No champion was named for the first time in the history of the league.

Teams

Promotion and relegation 
Fos Provence and Antibes Sharks were relegated after the 2018–19 season after the teams ended in the last two places.

Roanne and Orléans were promoted from the Pro B League.

Locations and arenas

Regular season

League table

Results

Statistical leaders

French clubs in European competitions

References

External links
Official website

LNB Pro A seasons
French
LNB Pro A
France